Natural Ingredients is the debut studio album by American alternative rock band Luscious Jackson. It was released on August 23, 1994 by Grand Royal and Capitol Records.

The album peaked at number 114 on the Billboard 200 chart, as well as number 2 on the Heatseekers Albums chart.

Track listing
All songs composed by Jill Cunniff and Gabrielle Glaser, except "Surprise", by Jill Cunniff.

"Intro" – 0:05
"Citysong" – 4:20
"Deep Shag" – 3:32
"Angel" – 3:19
"Strongman" – 4:21
"Energy Sucker" – 3:33
"Here" – 3:33
"Intermission" – 0:14
"Find Your Mind" – 3:21
"Pelé Merengue" – 2:24
"Rock Freak" – 3:53
"Rollin'" – 4:14
"Surprise" – 2:46
"LP Retreat" – 5:29

"Citysong" contains elements from "On and On" by Curtis Mayfield, performed by Gladys Knight & The Pips.

Personnel
Luscious Jackson
Jill Cunniff – vocals (tracks 2–7, 9–14), bass guitar (2–5, 7, 9–12, 14), guitar (6, 13)
Gabrielle Glaser – vocals (2, 3, 5–7, 9–11, 14), bass guitar (2, 10, 13), guitar (3, 5, 7, 9, 11, 12, 14), Rhodes piano (3, 14), acoustic guitar (4), electric guitar (4), whammy-guitar (6), shaker (7), drum programming (11)
Vivian Trimble – piano (3–5, 7, 12, 13), wah-piano (4), wah-percussion (10), keyboard bass (11), Fender Rhodes (12), backing vocals (13)
Kate Schellenbach – drums (2–5, 7, 10–13), shaker (3, 4)

Technical
Jill Cunniff – co-producer
Gabrielle Glaser – co-producer
Tony Mangurian – co-producer, engineer, mixing
Kate Schellenbach – co-producer ("Strongman")
Paul Orofino – mixing
Tom Baker – mastering
Tuta Aquino – editing, sequencing
George Sewell – artwork
Twelve Point Rule Ltd. – design
Bryan Thatcher – cloud photo
Michael Lavine – back cover band photos
C.H.M. – inside photos

Charts

References

External links
 

1994 debut albums
Luscious Jackson albums
Grand Royal albums
Capitol Records albums